

Teo may refer to:

Arts and entertainment
 Teo (album), a 1957 album by Teo Macero and the Prestige Jazz Quartet
 "Teo", a song by Miles Davis from his 1961 album Someday My Prince Will Come
 "Teo", a song by Thelonious Monk from his 1964 album Monk
 Teo McDohl, a character in the video game Suikoden
 Teo, the paraplegic Earth Kingdom son of a mechanist who appears in Avatar: The Last Airbender
 Teo, a 1999 animated television series produced by BRB International and Violeta Denou
 "Téo & Téa", the sixteenth studio album by French electronic musician and composer Jean-Michel Jarre, released in 2007
 "Teo", a song by the American band Bright from their 1997 album The Albatross Guest House

People
 Teo (name), a list of people with the surname, given name or nickname
 Teo (singer), Belarusian singer Yuriy Vashchuk (born 1983)
 Teo, stage name of Romanian stand-up comedian and writer Claudiu Teohari (born 1981)

Other uses
 Teo, A Coruña, a municipality in the Spanish province of A Coruña
 Emisor Oriente Tunnel a wastewater tunnel in Mexico City (Túnel Emisor Oriente in Spanish).
 Teo LT telecommunications company in Lithuania
 Teo., a suffix for a private company limited by shares in Ireland
 TeO, Tellurium monoxide, a chemical compound
 TEO, a subdivision of the Inferior temporal cortex (IT) of the brain
 TEO, the National Rail station code for Theobalds Grove railway station, Hertfordshire, England

See also
 Te'o (disambiguation), a Samoan surname
 Teoh, the Min-nan spelling of the Chinese surname Zhang
 Teos ancient Ionian city